The 1927 European Wrestling Championships were held in Budapest (Hungary) in 1927 under the organization of the International Federation of Associated Wrestling (FILA) and the Hungarian Wrestling Federation. It only competed in the Greco-Roman style categories.

Medal table

Medal summary

Men's Greco-Roman

References

External links
FILA Database

1927 in European sport
Sports competitions in Hungary